Aslanyurdu is a village in the Mazgirt District, Tunceli Province, Turkey. The village is populated by Kurds of the Alan, Xiran tribes and of non-tribal affiliation. It had a population of 194 in 2021.

The hamlets of Aşağıçanakcı and Yukarıçanakçı are attached to the village.

References 

Villages in Mazgirt District
Kurdish settlements in Tunceli Province